Bridge City Independent School District is a public school district based in Bridge City, Texas, United States. In addition to Bridge City, the district serves a portion of West Orange (west of State Highway 87). The district operates one high school, Bridge City High School.

Finances
As of the 2010-2011 school year, the appraised valuation of property in the district was $808,213,000. The maintenance tax rate was $0.104 and the bond tax rate was $0.015 per $100 of appraised valuation.

Academic achievement
In 2011, the school district was rated "recognized" by the Texas Education Agency.  Thirty-five percent of districts in Texas in 2011 received the same rating. No state accountability ratings will be given to districts in 2012. A school district in Texas can receive one of four possible rankings from the Texas Education Agency: Exemplary (the highest possible ranking), Recognized, Academically Acceptable, and Academically Unacceptable (the lowest possible ranking).

Historical district TEA accountability ratings
2011: Recognized
2010: Recognized
2009: Recognized
2008: Recognized
2007: Academically Acceptable
2006: Recognized
2005: Academically Acceptable
2004: Recognized

Schools
In the 2018-2019 school year, the district operates four schools. 
Bridge City High School (Grades 9-12)
Bridge City Middle School (Grades 6-8)
Bridge City Intermediate School (Grades 3-5)
Bridge City Elementary (Grades PK-2)

Special programs

Athletics
Bridge City High School participates in the boys sports of baseball, basketball, football, and soccer, . The school participates in the girls sports of basketball, soccer, softball, and volleyball. For the 2014 through 2016 school years, Bridge City High School will play football in UIL Class 4A.

Bridge City won its only state championship in football in 1966 against McKinney High School 30-6 under head coach Harold "Chief" Wilson after losing to Brownwood High School the previous year.

Notable alumni
 Matt Bryant, placekicker for the Atlanta Falcons of the National Football League
 Steve Worster, halfback for the University of Texas Longhorns 1968-71
 Shane Dronett, defensive lineman for the Atlanta Falcons and Denver Broncos
 Jason Mathews, offensive tackle for the Indianapolis Colts and Tennessee Titans

See also

List of school districts in Texas
List of high schools in Texas

References

External links
Bridge City ISD

School districts in Orange County, Texas